Alexander (Sasha) Kashlinsky (born 1957 in Riga) is an astronomer and cosmologist working at NASA Goddard-Space-Flight-Center, known for work on dark flow
and the cosmic infrared background.

Kashlinsky has been interviewed by Morgan Freeman in season 2 of Through the Wormhole.

Biography
1976-1979: Tel Aviv University, Israel, Department of Physics & Astronomy
1979-1983: University of Cambridge, England, Institute of Astronomy

References

External links
Alexander Kashlinsky at Nasa.gov

Latvian astronomers
Living people
1957 births
Scientists from Riga